The Mezzalama Skyrace was an international high altitude endurance race competition, defunct in 2008, in upper Valtournenche Valley, in the Aosta Valley, Italy. The summer event in the Monte Rosa's massif has been carried out annually by the Mezzalama Trophy association since 2000, and was also named in honor of the mountain guide Ottorino Mezzalama.

Course description 
The starting point is in Saint-Jacques (1,680 metres a.s.l.), a hamlet in Ayas. The participants pass Verraz (2,380 metres a.s.l.), Saint-Oyen, and then the Blue Lake, then they take back the main track and meet to the moraine of the Grand Glacier of Verraz to reach the Refuge Ottorino Mezzalama, which is the turning point of the circuit. Total course length is 15 kilometres with a 1,356 metre altitude difference, to be finished in a maximum time of 4 hours.

Winners

See also 
 Skyrunner World Series
 Mezzalama Trophy

References

External links 
 trofeo mezzalama

Skyrunning competitions
Sport in Aosta Valley
Defunct athletics competitions
Defunct sports competitions in Italy
Recurring sporting events established in 2000
Recurring sporting events disestablished in 2008